The Mukhi House also known as Mukhi Mahal is a heritage home  located in Hyderabad, Sindh, Pakistan. It was built in 1920 by Jethanadas Mukhi. The Mukhi House is opened for the public as an archaeological museum after restoration of the building's disfigured glory.

History
It was once visited by former Indian prime minister Jawaharlal Nehru and other personalities of the subcontinent.

See also
 List of cultural heritage sites in Sindh
 List of cultural heritage sites in Pakistan

References

Archaeological sites in Sindh
Hyderabad District, Pakistan